Lewis Johnson is an American sports commentator and sports reporter. He is one of the few sports broadcasters to have worked for ABC, NBC and CBS. He has also worked for Westwood One, ESPN, the Pac-12 Network and Turner Sports.

Lewis is a graduate of the University of Cincinnati. The  Lewis placed 8th in the 800 meters at the 1987 NCAA Championships with his personal record of 1:47.00.

Career history
Johnson has worked for NBC since the 2000 Summer Olympics. He has covered Notre Dame football, the NBA, and the AFL as well as nine Olympic and two Paralympic games.

He has also worked for NBCSN, the Pac-12 Network, ESPN/ABC, CBS Sports and Turner Sports as well as Westwood One.

Career timeline

1999-2021 Bayou Classic on NBC Sideline reporter.
Olympics on NBC (2000, 2002, 2004, 2006, 2008, 2010, 2012, 2014, 2016, 2018, 2020, 2022)
Pac-12 Network football sideline reporter (2014–present)
NBA on TNT playoff sideline reporter (2011–2017); (2019)
NCAA March Madness (CBS/Turner) sideline reporter (2011–2017)
NFL on Westwood One Sports sideline reporter (2012)
College Football on ESPN sideline reporter (2012-2013)
SEC on CBS sideline reporter (2011)
College Football on Westwood One Sports sideline reporter (2008-2011)
College Football on Versus sideline reporter (2007-2010)
AFL on NBC sideline reporter (2003-2006)
Notre Dame Football on NBC sideline reporter (2001-2006)
NBA on NBC sideline reporter (2001-2002)
College Football on ABC sideline reporter (1995-1999)

References

African-American television personalities
Living people
National Basketball Association broadcasters
Year of birth missing (living people)
College basketball announcers in the United States
College football announcers
American television sports announcers
Arena football announcers
Notre Dame Fighting Irish football announcers
National Football League announcers
Olympic Games broadcasters
ArenaBowl broadcasters
African-American sports journalists
American sports journalists
Track and field broadcasters
University of Cincinnati alumni
21st-century African-American people